Stranocum is a small village and townland in north County Antrim, Northern Ireland. It had a population of 297 people (110 households) in the 2011 Census. (2001 Census: 285 people)

The village is west of the River Bush and is mostly on the gentle hill down to the river. Although mainly a commuter village it does have some services. These include a supermarket and petrol station, a vehicle service garage, animal feeds mill, trout farm, Bushvalley Primary School and a park.

Transport
Stranocum railway station opened on 18 October 1880, shut for goods traffic on 24 March 1924, and shut altogether on 3 July 1950. This was part of the Belfast and Northern Counties Railway (BNCR), later Northern Counties Committee (NCC), main line to Londonderry.

References 

Culture Northern Ireland

Villages in County Antrim